Villamayor (Viḷḷamayor) is one of thirteen parishes (administrative divisions) in Teverga, a municipality within the province and autonomous community of Asturias, in northern Spain.  It is within the outskirts of the Natural Park of Les Ubiñes-La Mesa.

The postal code is 33111.

Villages and hamlets
 Riomayor (Rimayor)
 Villamayor

References

Parishes in Teverga